Purves is a surname of British origin, which is a variant of Purvis. It is an occupational surname, meaning the person responsible for obtaining supplies for a household or monastery, derived from the Middle English purveys (meaning "provisions" or "supplies"), from the Old French porveoir ("to provide, supply"). Notable people with this surname include:

 Andrew Purves (born 1946), British theologian
 Austin M. Purves Jr. (1900–1977), American artist
 Barry Purves (born 1960), British animator and filmmaker
 Cec Purves (born 1933), Canadian politician
 Christopher Purves (born 1961), British singer
 Dale Purves (born 1938), American neurobiologist
 Daphne Purves (1908–2008), New Zealand educator
 Della Purves (1945–2008), British botanical artist
 Herbert Dudley Purves (1908–1993), New Zealand scientist
 James Purves (disambiguation), several notable people
 Jodie Purves (born 1984), Australian cricketer
 John Purves (disambiguation), several people
 John-Clay Purves (1825–1903), British curator and geologist
 Laidlaw Purves (1842–1917), Scottish surgeon and golf advocate
 Libby Purves (born 1950), British journalist
 Margaret Purves (1934–2021), British recipient of the Albert Medal, later exchanged for the George Cross
 Peter Purves (born 1939), British television presenter and actor
 Ted Purves (born 1964), American artist
 William Purves (banker) (born 1931), British banker

See also
 Purves (disambiguation)

References

Surnames of British Isles origin
English-language surnames